The 1953 Yugoslav First Basketball League season is the 9th season of the Yugoslav First Basketball League, the highest professional basketball league in SFR Yugoslavia.

Regular season

League table

Winning Roster  
The winning roster of Crvena zvezda:
  Aleksandar Gec
  Srđan Kalember
  Branko Nešić
  Đorđe Konjović
  Vojislav Pavasović
  Borislav Ćurčić
  Ladislav Demšar
  Đorđe Andrijašević
  Milan Bjegojević
  Borko Jovanović
  Dragan Godžić
  Obren Popović
  Rastko Radulović
  Milan Radivojević

Coach:  Nebojša Popović

External links  
 Yugoslav First Basketball League Archive 

1953